Steven Neil Turner (born March 28, 1965) is an American guitarist known for his work with Green River and Mudhoney.

Early life
Turner was born in 1965 in Houston, Texas, but moved with his family to Seattle when he was two.

Career
His first band was called The Ducky Boys. The lineup included future Pearl Jam member Stone Gossard. The Ducky Boys split around 1983.
Turner later joined Mark Arm in Mr. Epp and the Calculations, which Arm described as "The worst band in the world". Mr. Epp played their final show with Turner in 1984.

Turner was also the first guitarist in Green River which again featured Arm and Gossard, and also acquired the services of Jeff Ament (later Pearl Jam) on bass guitar.  Turner left the band in 1985, citing differences with the "careerist" Ament.

Arm and Turner started Mudhoney on New Year's Day, 1988. The Melvins bassist Matt Lukin was brought in, as was Dan Peters on drums.
With Mudhoney, Turner recorded all their albums from Superfuzz Bigmuff in 1988 to Digital Garbage in 2018.

Turner also has side projects such as The Thrown Ups, Monkeywrench, and played bass for a short time with legendary Seattle band The Fall-Outs. He also has released various solo recordings in a folk vein.

Other Work
Turner founded Super Electro, an independent record label, which ran from 1992 to 1998.

Discography

Green River discography

Solo discography

References

1965 births
Living people
Musicians from Houston
American rock guitarists
American male guitarists
Lead guitarists
Grunge musicians
Mudhoney members
Green River (band) members
Guitarists from Texas
20th-century American guitarists